Stapleton Township is one of twelve townships in Chickasaw County, Iowa, USA.  As of the 2000 census, its population was 781.

History
Stapleton Township was organized in 1857. It is named for Thomas G. Staples, an early settler and local postmaster.

Geography
According to the USGS, it contains six cemeteries: Lutheran, Our Lady of Mount Carmel, Saint Johns, Saint Johns German Lutheran, Stapleton Township and Stapleton Township.

Notes

References
 USGS Geographic Names Information System (GNIS)

External links
 US-Counties.com
 City-Data.com

Townships in Chickasaw County, Iowa
Townships in Iowa
1857 establishments in Iowa
Populated places established in 1857